"Love Me" is the debut single by British girl group Stooshe, featuring vocals from American rapper Travie McCoy. The song was released in the United Kingdom on 4 March 2012 as the lead single from the group's debut album, London with the Lights On (2013).

Background
The original version of the track, "Fuck Me", was first released online in March 2011. The version featured English rapper Suave Debonair and was accompanied by the release of a music video. The track (and the accompanying video) were removed from websites, including YouTube, in August 2011 following Stooshe's signing to Warner Music UK.

It was then announced in November 2011 that the group would re-record and release the track as "Love Me" in March 2012, this time featuring American rapper Travie McCoy. The re-recorded track, produced by Future Cut, was uploaded to the group's official site on 4 January 2012 – with confirmation of the track serving as the lead single for their debut album.

Chart performance
For the week ending 17 March 2012, "Love Me" debuted at number five on the UK Singles Chart and number seven on the Scottish Singles Chart, marking a debut appearance for the group on both. The track spent five weeks in the UK Top 75 between March and April.

Music video
The official music video to accompany the re-recorded version of "Love Me" featuring Travie McCoy was released online on 16 January 2012. Directed by Matt Stawski, the video sees the trio and McCoy partying in a fictional hotel.

Track listing

Charts

Release history

References

2012 debut singles
Stooshe songs
Travie McCoy songs
Songs written by Iyiola Babalola
2012 songs